KWJC (91.9 FM) is a classical music station operated by the University of Missouri-Kansas City. The station covers much of the Kansas City Metropolitan Area.

Between 1974 and 2006, KWJC was a conventional college radio station, operated by William Jewell College in suburban Liberty, Missouri, with a student staff. After that time, KWJC aired the national K-LOVE and Air1 formats from the Educational Media Foundation. When EMF bought a Kansas City translator (K300CH 107.9) and relocated Air1 there, KWJC went temporarily silent on May 31, 2019.  On July 1, 2020, UMKC assumed control of KWJC and the station returned to the air with a classical music format.

History

KWPB
KWPB went on the air in 1974. It was launched by the then-head of the William Jewell College communication department, Dr. Georgia B. Bowman. She convinced the college to name the station after a former Jewell president, Dr. Walter Pope Binns. The station broadcast from the third floor of the Yates College Union with a 10-watt FM transmitter that could reach the college campus and some of the surrounding town of Liberty. There were three rooms: an outer multipurpose production space, an inner work room where the meager collection of albums and '45s were stored, and the control room where broadcasting students operated a two-channel mixing board, two closed cartridge tape transports, one reel-to-reel tape deck and two turntables.  The transmitter was located in the control room, with the broadcast antenna mounted just outside the station on the roof of the union building.

Service interruptions were common.  When a volunteer was unable to make a shift assignment, the station went off the air.  During ice storms, common in that area, ice accumulation on the broadcast antenna would force the station to shut down to protect its transmitter. (KWPB staff learned this lesson the hard way, after internal transmitter components were destroyed during ice events and the station was forced to wait weeks for replacement parts to be shipped in.)  The station was also silent during school holidays, including the entire summer.

Much beloved and a little feared by her students, Dr. Bowman made sure that KWPB remained a primarily educational enterprise. The production space was used by students to produce "discussion" recordings, consisting of partly extemporaneous and partly edited recorded conversations among students about issues of the day, that were submitted for competitive evaluation against other college teams. Students wrote and produced public service announcements, ran station operations, and served as on-air talent. The first program director was a Jewell student named George Townsend who had some experience in radio broadcasting. The staff was all-volunteer, except that some students were paid under the U.S. government's work-study financial aid program.

The station broadcast classical music during the day when few students were likely to be listening, then contemporary music during evenings and weekends. Despite the Baptist heritage of the college, religious content was limited to a regular subscription to "The Word from Unity" and a Southern Baptist youth-oriented program called "Powerline,"  both of which arrived by mail on reel-to-reel tape.

Evening and weekend contemporary pop music broadcasts were much more popular with the staff, who viewed them as superior training experiences for a future broadcasting career.  The station's record collection was inadequate even for a small audience, so student disc jockeys often used their personal collections for their shows, producing a de facto play list that would best be described as eclectic and expansive.  These evening shows were not very popular with Dr. Bowman, who occasionally called in to ban a song she had just heard over the air (Bob Marley's "I Shot the Sheriff" is one example.)

Eventually, William Jewell football broadcasts were launched for most home and away games.  A modest equipment package allowed a two-person broadcast crew to send live play-by-play and color back to the station by telephone link, which were typically dial-up. Leased lines were used as the meager station budget allowed.

During the early years, KWPB did not sell sponsorships that are otherwise common in public broadcasting. The college development staff worried that such appeals might dilute Jewell's larger fundraising efforts, and so the station was forced to survive on a small allocation from the school's operating budget.  Necessity being the mother of invention, the student staff and director Dr. Bowman improvised.

During the second year of operation, students purchased building materials from a local Liberty merchant (with funds probably provided from Dr. Bowman's personal account) and installed a soundproof, windowed partition between the broadcast booth and the transmitter, finally eliminating transmitter fan noises that had been so noticeable when a microphone was open in the booth. The work was done while the station was on-air, so construction volunteers were forced to suspend work whenever microphones were open.

One cartridge closed-loop tape player used to play public service announcements developed a habit of burning out an internal solid state part.  With no repair budget to deploy, student staff enlisted the help of the physics department to diagnose the problem and isolate and replace the failed component.

When an electronics lab student assembled an Emergency Broadcast System receiver using Popular Mechanics plans and donated parts as a class assignment, station staff appropriated and installed the device in the broadcast booth, and from then on faithfully rebroadcast alerts from the other stations in Kansas City.

KWJC
The 1980s saw two modest upgrades: an ERP increase to 182 watts in 1982, and beginning January 1, 1985, new KWJC call letters, reflecting the name of the college. The station was known as "Stereo 91-9" in this era.

In its later years, the station was "The Edge", playing alternative music with a broad, eclectic playlist. However, the format came to an abrupt end when a tornado struck Liberty and the William Jewell campus; damage to the college was extensive, with most of the residence halls destroyed.

After the tornado, The Edge became "Jewell 91.9" with an adult contemporary format, after a new professor was brought on board and sought to revamp the radio program along the lines of a commercial radio station. The move also came with a $100,000 facility upgrade including all-new sound equipment; professional radio software, sound and recording equipment; and top-quality acoustic foam. Even though many students were disappointed about the change in format, most appreciated the ability to learn more of how a station operated.

EMF operation
Citing the costs of running the radio station (and probably the decline of radio jobs available to graduates due to the rise of audio streaming and other technologies), William Jewell College opted to terminate the Radio Communication program after the 2005–06 school year and lease KWJC to the Educational Media Foundation to air its K-LOVE Christian radio network. On May 31, 2006, at noon, a few sad members of the Jewell 91.9 Student & Faculty Staff said an on-air goodbye and the station was handed over.

After Union Broadcasting sold KCXM to EMF, KWJC switched from K-LOVE to the Air1 network on December 16, 2007. That same year, the FCC approved a 1998 application to increase power to 4,000 watts; in 2016, it was approved to upgrade to 7,000 watts.

On May 31, 2019, William Jewell College took KWJC silent, citing a loss of programming. The move came after EMF bought K300CH, a translator facility of KCFX-HD3 in Kansas City, from the Calvary Chapel of Kansas City for $515,000, and Air1 moved to the 107.9 frequency, with KWJC airing a loop redirecting listeners to 107.9 and 101.1 HD3.

Sale to UMKC, flip to classical
On August 16, 2019, KCUR-FM, the National Public Radio affiliate operated by the University of Missouri-Kansas City (UMKC), announced they had agreed to purchase KWJC from William Jewell College for $2 million, with the intent to flip 91.9 into a full-time classical music station, returning the format to the FM band in Kansas City for the first time since KXTR moved to the AM band in August 2000, which would eventually flip to a business talk format in March 2012. With the move, KCUR eliminated its three-hour weeknight block of classical programming fed from NPR.

The purchase was consummated on June 26, 2020. On June 30, KWJC returned to the air with a classical music format, fed by American Public Media's "Classical 24" service.

References

External links

WJC
Clay County, Missouri
WJC
Radio stations established in 1974
1974 establishments in Missouri
Classical music in the United States